Solidago spathulata, the coast goldenrod or dune goldenrod, is a North American species of goldenrod in the family Asteraceae. It is native to the Pacific Coastal regions of the United States, in the states of Oregon and California.

Solidago spathulata is perennial herb up to 50 cm (20 inches) tall with a branching underground caudex. One plant can produce as many as 100 small yellow flower heads in a branching array. The species grows on coastal sand dunes and on hillsides overlooking the Pacific.

References

External links

spathulata
Flora of Oregon
Flora of California
Plants described in 1836
Flora without expected TNC conservation status